J. "Bob" Balaram is an Indian-American scientist and engineer currently working for National Aeronautics and Space Administration. He is the chief engineer and designer of Ingenuity (project name: Mars 2020 helicopter), the first extraterrestrial aircraft, that was attached underside of car-sized Perseverance rover that successfully landed on the Mars in February 2021.

Early life and education 
Balaram completed his Bachelor of Technology course from Indian Institute of Technology, Madras, India in 1980, and further went to receive his MS and Ph.D. in Computer and Systems Engineering from Rensselaer Polytechnic Institute, New York.

Work at NASA 
Bob joined NASA's JPL in 1985 after finishing his doctorate. He has been working at Jet Propulsion Laboratory for the past 20 years in Mobility & Robotic Systems Department. During his time here, Bob has been actively engaged in the area of telerobotics technology development for several Mars rovers, planetary balloons, descent and landing technology, and surface mobility technology. He is recipient of two NASA awards.

In 2012 MiMi Aung was leading then JPL director Charles Elachi on a tour of the Autonomous Systems Division. Looking at the drones demonstrating onboard navigation algorithms in one of the labs, Elachi asked, “ Hey, why don't we do that on Mars?” Engineer Bob Balaram briefed Elachi about feasibility, and a week later Elachi told him, “ Okay, I’ve got some study money for you”. By January 2015 NASA agreed to fund the development of a full-size model, which came to be known as the “risk reduction” vehicle.

Scientific publications

Video

See also 
 Swati Mohan
 MiMi Aung

Status reports of Bob Balaram in the Ingenuity mission

References

Sources

External links

 Bob Balaram's profile at NASA
 

NASA people
Mars 2020
IIT Madras alumni
American people of Indian descent
20th-century Indian engineers
Jet Propulsion Laboratory
Rensselaer Polytechnic Institute alumni
Year of birth missing (living people)
Living people